Mavelikkara Diocese is one of the 30 dioceses of the Malankara Orthodox Syrian Church. The diocese was created on 10 August 2002. H.G Vattamparambil Dr Abraham Mar Epiphanios is the Metropolitan of the diocese. The head office is located in TheoBhavan Aramana, Thazhakkara, Mavelikkara.

History

This diocese was founded on 10 August 10 2002. It was inaugurated in the presence of Baselios Mar Thoma Mathews II, former Catholicos of the East. Kolathukalathil Paulose Pachomios was the first Metropolitan. Forty parishes and twelve chapels of the dioceses of Kollam, Niranam and Chengannoor, and the erstwhile 39 parishes here were annexed to the newly introduced one. The headquarters of the diocese was consecrated by Baselios Mar Thoma Didymos I in 2008. On 1 August 2012, Mar Pachomios died and Baselios Mar Thoma Paulose II, the then-Malankara Metropolitan, became the metropolitan and appointed Sankarathil Joshua Mar Nicodimos as the assistant metropolitan.  In 2017, Alexios Eusebios was appointed the assistant metropolitan. In 2021, Baselios Marthoma Paulose II died and Baselios Marthoma Mathews III became the metropolitan.

Now

The diocese is reigned  by the Malankara Metropolitan Baselios Marthoma Mathews III. Alexios Eusebius is the current Assistant Metropolitan of the Diocese. There are 41 churches and nine chapels with fifty priests in diocese. 

Paulose Mar Pachomios Shalem Bhavan, which cares for 60 men with mental health issues, is located in Arunoottimangalam and run by the diocese. Cheppad Mar Dionysious Old Age Home situated at Cheppad and St Thomas Balabhavan at Haripad are other charitable institutions under the diocese.

References

External links
Website of Malankara Orthodox Church

Malankara Orthodox Syrian Church dioceses
2002 establishments in Kerala